Joshua Fife (born 1 July 2000) is an Australian racing driver from Canberra, Australia. He is currently competing in the S5000 Australian Drivers' Championship with 88Racing, driving the No. 88 Onroak-Ligier-Ford.

Biography
Fife began karting at the age of 10, competing in national events around the world. After karting full-time in Italy, he returned to Australia in 2019 and joined the Super3 Series with Brad Jones Racing. In his debut season, he scored two race wins and five podium finishes to finish fifth in the driver's standings.  In December 2019 after a test day with Brad Jones Racing at Winton Raceway, Fife was announced to be joining the team in their Super2 program for 2020.

Racing record

Karting career summary

Career summary

References

External links
 
 https://www.supercars.com/drivers/josh-fife/

2000 births
Australian racing drivers
Supercars Championship drivers
Sportspeople from Canberra
Living people